Mexborough Town Football Club was an English association football club based in Mexborough, Doncaster, South Yorkshire.

History
Founded in 1962, the club was the third senior club to originate from the town, following in the footsteps of Mexborough and Mexborough Athletic.

They joined the Yorkshire League in their inaugural season, with a runners-up finish securing promotion from Division Two to the league's top flight. They finished runners-up in Division One at the first time of asking, and would enter the FA Cup for the first time the following year. They would again finish as league runners-up in 1969 before finally securing their first Yorkshire League title in 1973. It was around this time that they changed their name to Mexborough Town Athletic, and in 1974 they took the decision to enter teams into both the Yorkshire League and the Midland League. This arrangement would only last a year, as the club decided to stay solely in the Midland League.

In 1982 the Yorkshire League and Midland League merged to form the Northern Counties East League (NCEL), and Mexborough were among the founder members of the new competition, being entered into the Premier Division. They were relegated to Division One in 1985 before changing their name back to Mexborough Town.

After finishing bottom of the NCEL Division One in 1991, they resigned from the NCEL to join the Central Midlands League, but they would last just two years in this competition before resigning and disbanding.

League and cup history

Honours

League
Yorkshire League Division 1
Champions: 1972–73
Runners-up: 1963–64, 1968–69
Yorkshire League Division 2
Promoted: 1962–63

Cup
Sheffield & Hallamshire Senior Cup
Winners: 1963–64, 1974–75, 1976–77, 1982–83
Runners-up: 1963–64, 1977–78, 1978–79

Records
Best FA Cup performance: 4th Qualifying Round, 1975–76
Best FA Trophy performance: 3rd Round, 1972–73
Best FA Vase performance: Preliminary Round, 1985–86

References

Defunct football clubs in England
Mexborough
Sport in the Metropolitan Borough of Doncaster
Association football clubs established in 1962
Yorkshire Football League
Defunct football clubs in South Yorkshire
1962 establishments in England
Central Midlands Football League
Midland Football League (1889)
Northern Counties East Football League